Your Honor is a 2018 South Korean television series starring Yoon Shi-yoon, Lee Yoo-young, Park Byung-eun, and Kwon Nara. It aired from July 25 to September 20, 2018 on SBS TV's Wednesdays and Thursdays at 22:00 (KST) time slot for 32 episodes.

Synopsis
It tells the story of identical twin brothers who have the same level of intellect but lead entirely different lives.

Cast

Main
 Yoon Shi-yoon as Han Kang-ho/Han Soo-ho (dual role)

 
 Lee Yoo-young as Song So-eun
 A hard-working student in the Judicial Research and Training Institute.
 Park Byung-eun as Oh Sang-cheol
 The heir to a law firm. 
 Kwon Nara as Joo-eun
 An anchorwoman who is Soo-ho's girlfriend.

Supporting
 Kim Hye-ok as Im Geum-mi
 Kwak Sun-young as Song Ji-yeon
 Sung Dong-il as Sa Ma-ryong
 Heo Sung-tae as Hong Jung-soo
 Kim Myung-gon as Oh Dae-yang
 Yoon Na-moo as Lee Ho-sung
 Shin Sung-min as Park Jae-hyung
 Heo Ji-won as Jin Wook-tae
 Park Ji-hyun as Park Hae-na
 Kim Kang-hyun as Section Chief Jo Bok-soo
 Ha Kyung as Ji Chang-soo
 Hwang Seok-jeong as Lee Ha-yeon
 Baek Chul-min as Kang In-gyoo
 Han Soo-yeon as Bang Woo-jeong

Others
 Lee Ki-hyuk as Choi Min-kook
 Kang Ki-dung as high school student
 Jo Seung-yeon

Special appearance
 Jung Min-sung as Chef Shin
 Woo Hyun as staff at National Institute of Scientific Investigation

Production
The first script reading took place in June 2018 at SBS Ilsan Production Center in Tanhyun, South Korea.

Original soundtrack

Part 1

Part 2

Part 3

Part 4

Part 5

Part 6

Ratings

Awards and nominations

Notes

References

External links
  
 
 

Seoul Broadcasting System television dramas
Korean-language television shows
2018 South Korean television series debuts
2018 South Korean television series endings
South Korean legal television series
Television series by IHQ (company)
Television series by Studio S